The New Towns movement refers to towns that were built in the United Kingdom after World War II and the associated social movement to advocate for their construction.  These towns were planned, developed, and built with two main intentions: to remedy overcrowding and congestion in some instances, and to organize scattered ad hoc settlements in others. The bigger purpose of this development was to decongest larger industrialised cities, and to rehouse people in freshly built, fully planned towns that were completely self-sufficient for the community.

The "urban disease"
In 1918, at a time when nineteenth century sanitary advances had revealed how unhygienic urban environments were, and owing to pioneers such as Patrick Geddes, the relationship between social issues and town planning was slowly being realised. Frederick Osborn referred to urban problems collectively as the "urban disease".
The urban disease, a by-product of the industrial revolution, was brought on by a vicious cycle whereby industry chose to set up near population bases to ensure labour demands could be met, which in turn attracted rural migrants seeking work to move into the city, prompting further industry, and so on. This resulted in greater pollution in the city, higher populations, and denser living conditions. Moreover, rural areas declined rapidly due to loss of population. Furthermore, there were no powers in place to stop prosperous families moving to open spaces, or from industry growing in urban centres. Fringe growth was vigorous and existing centres, along with rural areas were left to deteriorate. Accordingly, those who moved to new fringe suburbs to escape the congestion were in fact "bolstering the very process that caused them to move away."

Aspirations for change 
It was not until 1817 that the first model communities were proposed by social reformer Robert Owen to address overcrowded towns. Inspired by John Bellers's 1695 proposal for a College of Industry, a colony for the poor enabling disadvantaged people to work and their children to be educated, Owen proposed small, self-contained communities of about twelve hundred people reliant on agriculture but with some other industry. However, his plans "foundered under the heavy weight of revolutionary ideas"  Further model community ideas continued to arise but were each dismissed owing to the perception that they were unconvincing as business ventures. 

Ebenezer Howard, creator of the Garden City Movement, successfully founded Letchworth Garden City (1903) and proved that new towns could be economically viable. This was affirmed by Bernard Shaw, co-founder of the London School of Economics, who referred to his investments in the Garden City Movement as "entirely satisfactory, both economically and morally."

Garden Cities and New Towns 

The New Town Movement was derived from the Garden City Movement, founded by Ebenezer Howard in the late 1800s, as an alternative to the overcrowded, polluted, chaotic and miserable industrial cities that had appeared in Britain. Towards the end of World War I, a group called the "New Townsmen" was formed, including members like Ebenezer Howard, F.J. Osborn, C.B. Purdom and W.G. Taylor. They began advocating for the development of 100 new cities to be built by the government.

F. J. Osborn 

If Howard is the "father" of Garden Cities, then Frederick J. Osborn is his "son" as champion of the New Towns. Osborn was born in 1885 and spent the majority of his life arguing the case for New Towns. Like Howard, he had quite a modest education, having never attended a university. In his early 30s, after meeting Howard through his job at the Howard Cottage Society, he took to the campaign for New Towns. The initial campaigns for the establishment of New Towns failed. Although housing was built, it was often in the form of a "garden suburb", or located on the edge of the existing cities – the antithesis of the Garden City idea. With an increasing lack of faith in the government to take up the flag for public housing and new towns, Howard suggested to Osborn that he was wasting his time lobbying government, and that he would be "as old as Methuselah" waiting for action.

Beginnings of reform
In 1909 a greater understanding of the "urban disease" saw Britain's first town planning legislation created. Although technically opposed to fringe development, the Housing, Town Planning, &c. Act 1909 did not prevent it. Instead, in light of recent success with the development of Hampstead Garden Suburb, the Act, realising that suburbs were easier to develop than towns, held the ethos that good suburbs were better than bad ones. Although planners of the day wanted new towns, they were busy dealing with the demand for suburbs: "it is difficult for a technician to earn a living in an ivory tower"  Moreover, new towns required government direction, which was beyond the scope of municipal powers alone.

Towards the end of World War I, the Garden City principles were reasserted by the "New Townsmen" (Howard, Osborn, Purdon, and Tayler), who, referring to the success of Letchworth, proposed 100 government-supported new towns to address post-war rebuilding. However, the need for post-war housing resulted in new suburbs being prioritised over towns for the next two decades, with some four million high standard houses built in between the wars.  Conversely, some attempts were made at designing rebuilding efforts as satellite towns such as Manchester's Wythenshawe and Liverpool's Speke and Knowsley, which also included provisions for industry. Nonetheless, these were still extensions of existing cities and not true New Towns. Furthermore, three-quarters of all the new housing was built privately meaning a default bottom-line approach was adopted into the inter-war development efforts.

During the inter-war years, the government created committees to study the problem of urban concentration. For example, the Committee on Unhealthy Areas, chaired by Neville Chamberlain (1919-1921), recommended the restriction of further industry in London and the relocation of some of the city's existing industry to garden cities. These studies became the origin of Chamberlain's urban decentralisation interests which led to his setting up of the Barlow Commission when he became Prime Minister. Further important advances included a 1935 Departmental Committee recommendation for the building of new towns in line with garden city principles, and a 1936 Special Areas Report reiterating the idea that no new industry should be allowed in London which gained public and political interest.

Barlow Royal Commission 
In 1938, Chamberlain, as the new Prime Minister, assigned a Royal Commission chaired by Sir Anderson Barlow to study the urban concentration of population and industry. The resulting report raised the problem of large towns as a public issue for the first time and concluded that "planned decentralisation" was favourable for national interests. However, owing to the outbreak of war in 1939, the 1940 publication of the Barlow Report was initially ignored due to more immediate priorities. However, it eventually became a turning point for New Towns policy.

The damage brought on by the Second World War provoked significant public interest in what post-war Britain would be like. This was encouraged by the government, who facilitated talk about a "Better Britain" to boost morale. The Barlow Report was quickly turned to as a best practice document.

In 1942, following the report's recommendation, the Government chose to create a central planning authority in the form of the Ministry of Works and Planning, which was commissioned to draft ideas on how to achieve Better Britain from an urban planning perspective. The British government also announced that the report's decentralisation and relocation of population and industry initiatives would be followed.

Plans and legislation 
Post-war rebuilding initiatives saw new plans drafted for London, which for the first time addressed the issue of decentralisation. Firstly, the County of London Plan of 1943 recognised that displacement of population and employment was necessary if the city was to be rebuilt at a desirable density. Moreover, the Greater London Plan of 1944 went further by suggesting that over one million people would need to be displaced into a mixture of satellite suburbs, existing rural towns, and new towns. 
	
In 1945, the New Towns Committee was formed to consider the "establishment, development, organisation, and administration"  of new towns. Within eight months of its formation, the committee had completed a highly comprehensive study into these issues, resulting in positive recommendations for the construction of new towns. Accordingly, the New Towns Act 1946 was passed which, coupled with the Town and Country Planning Act 1947, created a "machinery for positive town construction". These Acts resulted in a total of 28 New Towns being constructed in Britain over the following half-century.

New Towns in Britain 

It was in 1946 that the work of the "New Townsmen" finally paid off with the passing of the New Towns Act 1946. Swayed by the need for post-war reconstruction, more housing, and a call to halt any further expansion of London's girth, authorities saw that there was no alternative to the New Town solution. In total, 27 New Towns were built after 1946. These were: Stevenage, Crawley, Hemel Hempstead, Harlow, Hatfield, Basildon, Bracknell, and Milton Keynes outside London; Newton Aycliffe, Peterlee, and Washington in the North East; Skelmersdale and Runcorn in the North West; Corby, Telford, and Redditch in the Midlands; Cwmbran and Newtown in Wales; and in Scotland, East Kilbride, Glenrothes, Cumbernauld, Livingston, and Irvine. Towns that were expanded under the New Towns Act include Peterborough, Northampton, Warrington, Ipswich, and Preston-Leyland-Chorley.

The New Towns Act 1946 enabled the creation of New Town Development Corporations, whose responsibilities included the management, design and development of New Towns. Stevenage was the first New Town to be designated in 1946. The Stevenage Development Corporation Board existed between 1946 and 1980, when it was dissolved and its planning powers were passed to Stevenage Borough Council. Evelyn Denington, Baroness of Stevenage was the longest-serving chairwoman of the Stevenage Development Corporation, serving between 1966 to 1980, having also been a board member of the Corporation since 1950.

The New Towns movement globally 

There were similar problems for New Towns advocates in other areas of the world. In Hong Kong, the new towns were developed as an initiative from the British colonial government. In other areas, although they understood the concept and approved in large numbers, planners had trouble convincing their own governments or agencies of the merits of the proposal.

In the former USSR, more than 800 New Towns were founded after the 1917 Revolution, but their growth was not constrained by specific limits. For this reason it could be argued that these towns did not meet the criteria for New Towns since planned population and size limitations were an important part of the New Town idea. Other European countries such as France, Germany, Italy and Sweden also had some successes with new towns, especially as part of post-war reconstruction efforts.

Notable new towns in the United States include Reston, Virginia; Columbia, Maryland; Jonathan, Minnesota; Peachtree City, Georgia; and the "new town in town" of Riverside Plaza in Minneapolis.

New Towns in the United States 
As post-World War II suburban development began receiving critique, New Towns spread across America seeking to reimagine suburban living. In the United States, it was not until the 1960s that New Towns policies were put in place, although after World War II grants had been extended for such things as slum clearance, improved and increased housing, and road and highway construction, and in the 1950s, for "comprehensive renewal projects". In addition, the post-war American housing market emphasized the suburbanization of the country, which was bolstered through phenomena like white flight.

Privately-funded developments 
Founded by Robert E. Simon in 1964, Reston, Virginia became the first modern planned American New Town and quickly became a model and supporting argument for New Town expansion. Reston was planned with the intention of preserving greenspace and the surrounding woodlands, while developing dense village centers with unique architectural styles, shops, and things to do. Reston is one of the few success stories from the "New Town" boom, today boasting a population of 61,147 and rated the best place to live in Virginia in 2018. Its "cluster" principle of transit hubs and dense community centers paired with public parks and attractions takes form in many urban planning principles today.

Columbia, Maryland was founded in 1967 by James Rouse and planned with New Town principles. The area 15 miles outside of Washington, D.C., was initially split into six self-contained villages that surrounded the Town Center and mall. Each would have a village center - complete with its own shopping center, high school, and recreation facilities. Also included were interfaith centers to preserve land and host several religious denominations. Rouse was prolific in promoting mixed-use development in this development. Today, Columbia has a population of more than 100,000 and is regarded for its sense of community and early adoption of pedestrian-centric planning.

Reston and Columbia were notable New Towns from this period, though they still underwent financial restructuring or bankruptcy.

Publicly-funded developments 
After relative success in Reston and Columbia, new towns in the United States received federal support and funding after passage of the Housing and Urban Development Act of 1970. This law authorized the Secretary of Housing and Urban Development to finance property acquisition and development for the purpose of building new communities. Taking example from European New Town programs, developers in the United States planned new communities across the country, including: St. Charles, Maryland; Maumelle, Arkansas; The Woodlands, Texas; Soul City, North Carolina; Harbison, South Carolina; Shenandoah, Georgia; Jonathan, Minnesota; Park Forest South, Illinois; Cedar-Riverside, Minneapolis, Minnesota; Riverton, New York; Flower Mound, Texas; San Antonio Ranch, Texas; Gananda, New York; and Newfields, Ohio.

Of the fourteen communities funded under America's Title VII New Towns Program, thirteen went bankrupt. Financial losses, struggles attracting industry, and inadequate state and local involvement led to the program's rapid demise. For the thirteen communities that went bankrupt, loan guarantees of $300 million and assistance of $72 million were provided by the government. The Program was shut down in 1976, just six years after its founding.

See also
 Town and country planning in the United Kingdom
 Urban Planning
 New Urbanism
 Garden City Movement
 Suburbia

Notes

References 

Hall, P. (1996), Cities of Tomorrow: An Intellectual History of Urban Planning and Design in the Twentieth Century, Blackwell Publishers, Oxford. 
Hall, P. & Ward, C. (1998), Sociable Cities: the Legacy of Ebenezer Howard, John Wiley and Sons, Chichester. 
Osborn, F.J. & Whittick, A. (1969), the New Town:, the answer to megalopolis, Leonard Hill, London.

Urban planning